The 1895 Noblesville Athletic Club football team was an American football team that represented the Noblesville Athletic Club of Indiana in the 1895 college football season. Under coach and team manager Shubert Vestal, who played for Noblesville in 1894 as quarterback, the Athletic Club compiled a 3–3–2 record.

Schedule

References

Noblesville Athletic Club
Noblesville Athletic Club football seasons
Noblesville Athletic Club football